Kasthuri or Kasturi is a major Kannada monthly family-interest magazine published in Karnataka, India, which has its headquarters in Bengaluru, Karnataka. It is also published from Mangaluru, Gulbarga, Davangere, and Hubli.

Kasthuri covers topics like society, Kannada poetry, science fiction, spirituality, health, travel, technology, cookery, book review, beauty. It publishes a large number of editorial cartoon, on politics and society.

The magazine is subscribed in educational institutions like Tumkur University, JSS College of Arts, Commerce & Science, Kuvempu University, Mysore University, Mangalore University, and Gulbarga University etc.

History
Kasthuri (RNI:Reg.No.3633/1957) was first published in 1921. Ranganath Ramchandra Diwakar, an ex-president of the KPCC, established the ′Loka Shikshana Trust′ (meaning: World Education Trust)  on 27 April 1933, which publishes Kasthuri and Karmaveera (a weekly Kannada magazine).

Kannada writer and poet, P.V. Acharya, was one among the many editors of Kasthuri, including Radhakrishna Bhadti and writer, journalist Nagesh Hegde

See also
 List of Kannada-language magazines
 Media in Karnataka
 Media of India

References

1921 establishments in India
Monthly magazines published in India
Kannada-language magazines
Magazines established in 1921
Mass media in Bangalore